Bloom Township, Ohio may refer to:

Bloom Township, Fairfield County, Ohio
Bloom Township, Morgan County, Ohio
Bloom Township, Scioto County, Ohio
Bloom Township, Seneca County, Ohio
Bloom Township, Wood County, Ohio

See also
 Bloomfield Township, Ohio (disambiguation)

Ohio township disambiguation pages